Haile Plantation, an unincorporated community and New Urbanist planned development, is a 2,600-household (1,700 acre) development of regional impact southwest of the city of Gainesville, within Alachua County, Florida, United States.

Community
While the Village Center provides the life of the community, most residents reside within easy walking distance in one of two associations: Haile Plantation Homeowners' Association and Haile Plantation West Homeowners' Association.

Haile Village Center is the neighborhood center within the development. Residents and businesses in Haile Plantation use Gainesville for mailing addresses.

Haile Plantation also includes Publix Market Square, with multiple businesses centering on the Publix supermarket, including a UF Health clinic.

History
New construction of the planned development at Haile Plantation started in the late 1970s.

Naming controversy
The development's namesake is Thomas Evans Haile, a Sea Island Cotton South Carolina planter who developed a plantation here in 1854. Enslaved African-American people lived on and worked the land. The Haile family ancestors include some who served in the American Revolutionary War. The Historic Haile Homestead, known as Kanapaha, still stands. It was featured in the 1979 movie Gal Young 'Un, based on a Marjorie Kinnan Rawlings story.

On August 1, 2020, CNN published an opinion piece regarding the controversy of the Haile Planation name. The Haile Plantation West Home Owners Association formed an exploratory committee to evaluate the removal of the word "Plantation" from the name of the community. On October 26, 2020, the board of the Haile Plantation West Home Owners Association voted to keep the word "Plantation" in the name of the community.

References

External links
Historic Haile Homestead 

Unincorporated communities in Alachua County, Florida
Gainesville metropolitan area, Florida
Populated places established in 1854
Unincorporated communities in Florida
New Urbanism communities
Planned communities in Florida
1854 establishments in Florida